John Franz may refer to:

John E. Franz (born 1929), American organic chemist
John Baptist Franz (1896–1992), American Roman Catholic bishop
Johnny Franz (1922–1977), English record producer